Utva 213 Vihor was a late 1940s Yugoslavian two-seat advanced trainer.

Design and development
Designed and built by the Yugoslav state factory, the Type 213 was first flown in 1949, a cantilever low-wing monoplane powered by a 
 Ranger SVG-770-CB1 engine. The prototype had a conventional landing gear which retracted forward, the second prototype and production aircraft had a wider track main gear that retracted inwards. It had an enclosed cockpit for the instructor and student in tandem under a long glazed canopy. For training the Vihor had two forward-facing machine guns and could carry up to 100 kg of bombs. In 1957 an improved radial engined variant entered service as the Type 522.

Aircraft on display

One aircraft is on display at the Museum of Yugoslav Aviation, Belgrade, Serbia.

Specifications

See also

References

Notes

Bibliography

 

1940s Yugoslav military trainer aircraft
Single-engined tractor aircraft
Low-wing aircraft
Aircraft manufactured in Yugoslavia
Aircraft first flown in 1949